Riverside College may refer to:

Riverside College, Widnes, a further education college in the United Kingdom
Riverside College (Philippines), a medical college